{{Infobox station
| name                = Irvine Bank Street
| status              = Disused
| image               = Irvine Bank Street railway station.jpg
| caption             = The former station building in 2007
| borough             = Irvine, Ayrshire
| country             = Scotland
| coordinates         = 
| grid_name           = Grid reference
| grid_position       = 
| platforms           = 2
| original            = Lanarkshire and Ayrshire Railway
| pregroup            = Caledonian Railway
| postgroup           = London, Midland and Scottish Railway
| years               = 2 June 1890
| events              = Opened
| years1              = 1 January 1917
| events1             = Closed
| years2              = 1 February 1919
| events2             = Reopened
| years3              = 2 July 1924
| events3             = Renamed Irvine Bank Street
| years4              = 28 July 1930
| events4             = Closed to regular services
}}Irvine Bank Street railway station was a railway station serving the town of Irvine, North Ayrshire, Scotland as part of the Lanarkshire and Ayrshire Railway.

 History 
The station opened on 2 June 1890 and was simply known as Irvine. It closed between 1 January 1917 and 1 February 1919 due to wartime economy,Stansfield, page 27 and upon the grouping of the L&AR into the London, Midland and Scottish Railway in 1923, the station was renamed Irvine Bank Street on 2 June 1924. The station closed to passengers on 28 July 1930, however the line continued to be used for freight trains until 1939.

Today part of the former station buildings are in use by the Irvine Times local newspaper.

 References 
 Notes 

 Sources 
 
 
 Wark, Hugh, Webster, John and Higgins, Michael (1972). "Glimpses of a Caledonian Branch". In The Railway Magazine, Volume 118''', No. 851. Pages 128 - 131. (March 1972).

Disused railway stations in North Ayrshire
Railway stations in Great Britain opened in 1890
Railway stations in Great Britain closed in 1917
Railway stations in Great Britain opened in 1919
Railway stations in Great Britain closed in 1930
Former Caledonian Railway stations
Irvine, North Ayrshire